is a Japanese video game composer and musician. He is best known for his work on Final Fantasy XI (with Nobuo Uematsu and Kumi Tanioka), but has also composed music for Mega Man & Bass, Street Fighter Alpha, and Parasite Eve II. He started his career at Capcom before moving to Square (now Square Enix) in 1998.

Biography
Born in Kōchi, Japan in 1972, Mizuta's interest in music began to grow when he "was in the second or third grade". Although still interested in music, Mizuta studied law and economics at Chiba University. He composed his first song while in his last year there, and after graduating went to work for Capcom in 1995 as a composer. He began his career scoring the Street Fighter series where he was part of the sound team for Street Fighter Alpha in 1995.

In 1998, while still working for Capcom, Mizuta applied to Square as a composer in response to an advertisement and was hired. His first assignment for Square was to score Parasite Eve II, for which he was the sole composer and spent a year and a half working on. The original Parasite Eve game was scored by Yoko Shimomura, and Mizuta incorporated some of the original game's musical themes into the sequel. Mizuta's next role was as the main composer for Final Fantasy XI, with assistance from Nobuo Uematsu and Kumi Tanioka. Mizuta remained with the Final Fantasy XI project for over ten years, serving as the sole composer for the game's five expansions, and considers it his life's work. During this period, Mizuta became involved in The Star Onions, a band composed of Square Enix composers for which he plays bass guitar. Other members of the band, which plays arrangements of songs from Final Fantasy XI, include Tanioka, Hidenori Iwasaki, and Tsuyoshi Sekito. The band has since released two albums, Music from the Other Side of Vana'diel and Sanctuary.

Mizuta has also worked on several other projects for Square Enix, including Blood of Bahamut and Guardian Cross. He has also worked on many other games in the Final Fantasy series, including Final Fantasy: The 4 Heroes of Light, Final Fantasy XIII-2, Final Fantasy XIV, Final Fantasy XIV: A Realm Reborn, and Lightning Returns: Final Fantasy XIII.

Musical style and influences
For games, Mizuta is primarily focused on creating music that fits the title and the scene at hand, without consideration for how it might sound in isolation. On older consoles, the hardware restricted composers to three channels of audio. Working within these limitations, Mizuta was challenged to create strong, memorable melodies without the aid of atmospheric and accompanying lines. Even without such constraints in modern titles, he feels that this style has its merits and is worth preserving. On the other hand, for alternative presentations of his music such as live performances or piano arrangements, Mizuta feels more free to have fun and play it however he likes. Mizuta is heavily influenced by the work of Ryuichi Sakamoto, as well as Nobuo Uematsu, his superior at Square. He also draws inspiration from a variety of film scores as well as fan remixes of his work on YouTube.

Works
 Street Fighter Alpha (1995) - with Isao Abe, Syun Nishigaki, Setsuo Yamamoto, and Yuko Takehara
 Resident Evil 2 (1998) - "The Underground Laboratory"
 Mega Man & Bass (1998) - with Toshihiko Horiyama and Akari Kaida
 Parasite Eve II (1999)
 Final Fantasy XI (2002) - with Nobuo Uematsu and Kumi Tanioka
 Tetra Master (2002)
 Final Fantasy XI: Rise of the Zilart (2003)
 Final Fantasy XI: Chains of Promathia (2004)
 Hanjuku Hero 4 ~The 7 Heroes~ (2005) - "Reckless Blood Manipulations" & "Hidden Research"
 Final Fantasy XI: Treasures of Aht Urhgan (2006)
 Final Fantasy XI: Wings of the Goddess (2007)
 The Shochu Bar (2007)
 Blood of Bahamut (2009)
 Final Fantasy: The 4 Heroes of Light (2009)
 Season of Mystery: The Cherry Blossom Murders (2009)
 Final Fantasy Dimensions (2010)
 Final Fantasy XIII-2 (2011) - with Masashi Hamauzu and Mitsuto Suzuki
 Final Fantasy XIV (2011) - additional music with Ryo Yamazaki and Tsuyoshi Sekito
 Guardian Cross (2012)
 Demons' Score (2012) - with various others
 Final Fantasy XI: Seekers of Adoulin (2013)
 Final Fantasy XIV: A Realm Reborn (2013) - with Masayoshi Soken, Tsuyoshi Sekito, and Ryo Yamazaki
 Lightning Returns: Final Fantasy XIII (2013) - with Masashi Hamauzu and Mitsuto Suzuki
 Deadman's Cross (2014)
 Glorious Blades (2014)
 Arcadia no Aoki Miko (2015) - with YOHKA
 Final Fantasy Dimensions II (2015)
 Final Fantasy XV: Episode Prompto (2017)
 Final Fantasy XIV: Stormblood (2017) - original compositions from Final Fantasy XI
 Stranger of Paradise: Final Fantasy Origin (2022) - with Hidenori Iwasaki and Ryo Yamazaki

References

External links
 

1972 births
21st-century bass guitarists
21st-century Japanese composers
21st-century Japanese male musicians
Capcom people
Chiba University alumni
Japanese bass guitarists
Japanese male composers
Living people
Male bass guitarists
People from Kōchi, Kōchi
Square Enix people
Video game composers